Ornithogalum dubium, common names sun star, star of Bethlehem or yellow chincherinchee, is a species of flowering plant in the family Asparagaceae, subfamily Scilloideae. It is a South African (Cape Province) endemic.

The Latin specific epithet dubium means "dubious" or "unlike others of the genus".

Description
The flowers are borne in winter or spring, in cylindrical to almost spherical racemes consisting of 5-25 flowers. The tepals may be orange, red, yellow or rarely white, often with a green or brown center.

Cultivation
O. dubium is frost-tender and is best overwintered in a dry, frost-free place, then re-potted in spring. The main soil requirement is excellent drainage, with ample water early in the growth cycle, but dry during the dormant season. The plant should be grown in a sheltered spot in full sun. It is reported to be toxic by ingestion, and the leaves cause irritation. 

This plant has gained the Royal Horticultural Society's Award of Garden Merit.

References

dubium
Flora of the Cape Provinces
Taxa named by Martinus Houttuyn